Yu Hourun (born 9 July 1964 in Jilin) is a retired Chinese discus thrower.

Her personal best throw was 68.62 metres, achieved in May 1988 in Beijing. The Chinese, and Asian, record is currently held by Xiao Yanling with 71.68 metres.

Achievements

References

External links

1964 births
Living people
Athletes (track and field) at the 1988 Summer Olympics
Chinese female discus throwers
Olympic athletes of China
Athletes from Jilin
Asian Games medalists in athletics (track and field)
Athletes (track and field) at the 1990 Asian Games
Asian Games silver medalists for China
Medalists at the 1990 Asian Games
20th-century Chinese women